Henry Dawes may refer to:

 Henry L. Dawes (1816–1903), U.S. Senator and U.S. Representative
 Henry M. Dawes (1877–1952), American businessman and banker